Bayerius zenkevitchi is a species of sea snail, a marine gastropod mollusk in the family Buccinidae, the true whelks.

Description

Distribution
This abyssal marine species was found in the Peru-Chile Trench at 5200–6040 m.

References

 Lus V.J. (1975). New species of molluscs - Tacita zenkevitchi (Buccinidae) from the lower-abyssal of Peru-Chile Trench region, with description of the egg capsules and some stages of ontogenesis. [In Russian]. Trudy Instituta Okeanologii AN SSSR. 103: 162-178.

External links
 Warén A. & Bouchet P. (2001). Gastropoda and Monoplacophora from hydrothermal vents and seeps new taxa and records. The Veliger, 44(2): 116-231
 Kantor Y.I., Kosyan A., Sorokin P., Herbert D.G. & Fedosov A. (2020). Review of the abysso-hadal genus Bayerius (Gastropoda: Neogastropoda: Buccinidae) from the North-West Pacific, with description of two new species. Deep Sea Research Part I: Oceanographic Research Papers. 160: 103256

Buccinidae
Gastropods described in 2001